Thomas John Kilcline Jr. (born November 19, 1951) is a retired vice admiral of the United States Navy who served as Commander, Naval Air Forces from June 22, 2007, to July 1, 2010.

Naval career
Kilcline graduated from the United States Naval Academy in 1973 with a Bachelor of Science in operations research. He was selected for naval aviation and upon receiving his commission was sent to NAS Pensacola for initial flight training. He earned his wings in 1975.

Following completion of replacement air group training at NAS Miramar, California, he was assigned to VF-51 aboard the  flying the F-4 Phantom. Next he was selected for VF-126, where he flew as an adversary pilot. Two deployments followed with VF-213 aboard . He later assumed command of Carrier Air Wing 14 aboard . His most recent operational assignment was as commander, Carrier Strike Group Two and commander,  Carrier Strike Group. He has flown over 5,600 hours in F-4, A-4, F-5, F-14 and F/A-18 aircraft, and has logged 63 combat missions. He has made 1,150 carrier aircraft arrested landings, making him a member of the 1000 trap "Grand Club".

Assignments to shore and staff billets include Fighter AEW Wing Pacific strike officer; Joint Task Force Southwest Asia DJ3; Air Operations Officer to Commander 2nd Fleet; Chief of Naval Operations Chair to the National War College; executive assistant to Deputy, European Command; and Chief of Staff for Commander, Naval Air Forces. Kilcline earned a Master of Science in Systems Management from the University of Southern California, graduating with distinction; He received a Master of Arts in Strategic Studies and National Affairs from the U.S. Naval War College, and earned his Master of Science in National Security Strategy while assigned to the National War College.

Kilcline's first shore duty flag assignment was as director, Naval Aviation Plans and Requirements (N780) on the OPNAV Staff. Following his strike group command, he assumed duties as director, Air Warfare Division (N88) followed by his assignment as director, Warfare Requirements and Integration/Senior National Representative (N8F). He assumed the duties of Commander, Naval Air Forces on June 22, 2007. Kilcline handed over command on July 1, 2010, to Vice Admiral Allen G. Myers, retiring shortly afterward.

Awards and decorations

References

External links

 Official Navy Biography

1951 births
Living people
United States Naval Academy alumni
United States Navy personnel of the Vietnam War
United States Naval Aviators
University of Southern California alumni
United States Navy personnel of the Gulf War
Recipients of the Air Medal
Naval War College alumni
National War College alumni
United States Navy admirals
Recipients of the Legion of Merit
Recipients of the Defense Superior Service Medal
Recipients of the Navy Distinguished Service Medal